Tatlinʼs Tower, or the project for the Monument to the Third International (1919–20), was a design for a grand monumental building by the Russian artist and architect Vladimir Tatlin, that was never built. It was planned to be erected in Petrograd (now St. Petersburg) after the Bolshevik Revolution of 1917, as the headquarters and monument of the Comintern (the Third International).

Plans
Tatlinʼs Constructivist tower was to be built from industrial materials: iron, glass and steel. In materials, shape and function, it was envisaged as a towering symbol of modernity. It would have dwarfed the Eiffel Tower in Paris. The main framework would contain four large suspended geometric structures. These structures would rotate at different rates. At the base of the structure was a cube which was designed as a venue for lectures, conferences and legislative meetings, and this would complete a rotation in the span of one year. Above the cube would be a smaller pyramid housing executive activities and completing a rotation once a month. Further up would be a cylinder, which was to house an information centre, issuing news bulletins and manifestos via telegraph, radio and loudspeaker, and would complete a rotation once a day. At the top, there would be a hemisphere for radio equipment. There were also plans to install a gigantic open-air screen on the cylinder, and a further projector which would be able to cast messages across the clouds on any overcast day.

Evaluations
There are serious doubts about the tower’s structural practicality, had it ever been built—which it was not because of the gigantic amount of steel required, which was impossible to obtain in bankrupt post-revolutionary Russia, in the context of housing shortages and political turmoil.

Tatlin's tower was critical to Soviet propaganda. Symbolically, the tower was said to represent the aspirations of its originating country and a challenge to the Eiffel Tower as the foremost symbol of modernity. Soviet critic Viktor Shklovsky is said to have called it a monument "made of steel, glass and revolution."

Models

There are models of Tatlinʼs Tower at the Moderna Museet in Stockholm, Sweden, at Tretyakov Gallery in Moscow, and at Musée National d'Art Moderne at the Centre Georges Pompidou in Paris. A 1:42 model was built at The Royal Academy of Arts, London in November 2011. In September 2017, the same 1:42 model was erected as part of the ʻRussian Seasonʼ at the Sainsbury Centre for Visual Arts in Norwich. Since the exhibition closed in February 2018, the tower is expected to continue as a feature of the University of East Anglia's 'sculpture park' until the end of 2021.

Ai Weiweiʼs 2007 sculpture Fountain of Light, currently on display at the Louvre Abu Dhabi, is modelled on the Tatlin Tower.

See also
 Shukhov Tower
 Tower Bawher, an abstract short film inspired by Tatlin's Tower.
 Disco Elysium, the mazovians build a model eerily similar to Tatlin's Tower.

References and sources
References

Sources
 Tatlinʼs Tower: Monument to Revolution, Norbert Lynton, Yale University Press, 2008
 Art and Literature under the Bolsheviks: Volume One – The Crisis of Renewal Brandon Taylor, Pluto Press, London 1991
 Tatlin, edited by L.A. Zhadova, Thames and Hudson, London 1988
 Concepts of Modern Art, edited by Nikos Stangos, Thames and Hudson, London 1981
 Vladimir Tatlin and the Russian avant-garde, John Milner, Yale University Press, New Haven 1983
 Nikolai Punin. The Monument to the Third International, 1920

External links

 Tatlinʼs Tower and the World — Artist group's web site on the project of building Tatlin's Tower in full scale.
  – using computer graphics, archive footage and locations in Moscow, this film illustrates Tatlin's contribution to world architecture and how his tower may have looked in Moscow had it been built after the revolution; by Michael Craig; 3:37.
 Photographs of Tatlin and his assistants constructing the first model for the monument to the Third International, Petrograd, 1920, Canadian Centre for Architecture (digitized items)

Comintern
Russian avant-garde
Soviet art
Towers in Russia
Constructivist architecture
Unbuilt buildings and structures in Russia
Proposed monuments and memorials